Anneliese Brandler (4 March 1904 – 1970) was a German chess player who won the West Germany Women's Chess Championship in 1962.

Biography
In the 1950s and in the 1960s, Anneliese Brandler was one of the leading chess players in the West Germany. She won six medals in West Germany Women's Chess Championships: gold (1962), three silver (1957, 1958, 1963) and two bronzes (1959, 1961).

Brandler played for West Germany in the Women's Chess Olympiad:
 In 1963, at second board in the 2nd Chess Olympiad (women) in Split (+3, =2, -6).

References

External links

1904 births
1970 deaths
German female chess players
Chess Olympiad competitors
20th-century chess players